The 2008 Dakar Rally would have been the 30th running of the annual off-road race. The rally was to start in Lisbon, Portugal on 5 January 2008, running through Europe and Africa until the finish in Dakar, Senegal on 20 January. The event was cancelled one day before the intended start date, due to concerns over a possible terrorist attack aimed at the competitors.

Cancellation 

The rally was cancelled on 4 January 2008, due to safety concerns in Mauritania, following the killing of four French tourists there on Christmas Eve, December 2007. France-based Amaury Sport Organisation (ASO), in charge of the  rally, said in a statement they had been advised by the French government to cancel the race. They said direct threats had also been made against the event by "terrorist organizations". Before the start of the race, rally director Étienne Lavigne had approved the Mauritanian legs only after two stages planned for Mali were scrapped. An Al-Qaeda affiliate organization was blamed for the cancellation.

On 4 February 2008, the ASO organised the Central Europe Rally, with a Hungary to Romania route, as the rescheduled and relocated race, which technically is part of the lineage of the Dakar Rally, as the ASO held all entries over to the event, which lasted only one year.  A new race, keeping the Dakar Rally name, was organised in South America in 2009 and was held until 2019, where in 2020 the race moved to Saudi Arabia.

Entrants 
As of December 2007 there were 245 motorbikes, 20 quads, 205 cars, and 100 trucks. A total of 570 teams from various countries (50) were entered, up from 510 in 2007.

All entries were deferred to the Central Europe Rally.  110 motorbikes, 19 quads, 91 cars, and 40 trucks took the start of the Central Europe Rally.

Route
The race would have begun in Lisbon, Portugal, and passed through Spain, Morocco, Western Sahara, Mauritania, and Senegal. There would have been a rest day in Nouakchott on 13 January.

Planned Stages

†Smara is located in the Moroccan-administered portion of the Western Sahara

References 

Dakar Rally
Dakar Rally
Dakar Rally, 2008
Dakar Rally 2008
Dakar Rally